Jack Warden (born John Warden Lebzelter Jr.; September 18, 1920July 19, 2006) was an American character actor of film and television. He was nominated for the Academy Award for Best Supporting Actor for Shampoo (1975) and Heaven Can Wait (1978). He received a BAFTA nomination for Shampoo, and won an Emmy for his performance in Brian's Song (1971).

Early life
Warden was born in Newark, New Jersey, the son of Laura M. (née Costello) and John Warden Lebzelter, who was an engineer and technician.

He was of Pennsylvania Dutch (German) and Irish ancestry. Raised in Louisville, Kentucky, he was expelled from high school for fighting and eventually fought as a professional boxer under the name Johnny Costello. He fought in 13 bouts as a welterweight, but earned little money.

World War II
Warden worked as a nightclub bouncer, tugboat deckhand, and lifeguard, before joining the United States Navy in 1938. He was stationed for three years in China with the Yangtze Patrol.

In 1941, he joined the United States Merchant Marine, but he quickly tired of the long convoy runs, and in 1942, he moved to the United States Army, where he served as a paratrooper in the 501st Parachute Infantry Regiment, with the 101st Airborne Division in World War II. In 1944, on the eve of the D-Day invasion (in which many of his friends died), Warden, then a staff sergeant, shattered his leg when he landed in a tree during a night-time practice jump in England. He spent almost eight months in the hospital recuperating, during which time he read a Clifford Odets play and decided to become an actor. Notably, Warden later portrayed a paratrooper from the 101st's rivals—the 82nd Airborne Division—in That Kind of Woman.

After leaving the armed services, he moved to New York City and studied acting on the G.I. Bill. He joined the company of the Dallas Alley Theatre and performed on stage for five years. In 1948, he made his television debut on the anthology series The Philco Television Playhouse and also appeared on the series Studio One. His first film role, uncredited, was in the 1951 film You're in the Navy Now, a film that also featured the screen debuts of Lee Marvin and Charles Bronson.

Career

Warden appeared in his first credited film role in 1951 in The Man with My Face. From 1952 to 1955, he appeared in the television series Mister Peepers with Wally Cox. In 1953, he was cast as a sympathetic corporal in From Here to Eternity. Warden's breakthrough film role was Juror No. 7, a salesman who wants a quick decision in a murder case, in 12 Angry Men.

Warden guest-starred in many television series over the years, such as Marilyn Maxwell's ABC drama series, Bus Stop, and on David Janssen's ABC drama, The Fugitive. He received a supporting actor Emmy Award for his performance as Chicago Bears coach George Halas in the television movie, Brian's Song, and was twice nominated for his starring role in the 1980s comedy/drama series Crazy Like a Fox.

Warden was nominated for Academy Awards as Best Supporting Actor for his performances in Shampoo and Heaven Can Wait. He also had notable roles in Bye Bye Braverman, The Man Who Loved Cat Dancing, All the President's Men, The White Buffalo, ...And Justice for All, Being There, Used Cars (in which he played dual roles), The Verdict, Problem Child and its sequel, as well as While You Were Sleeping, Guilty as Sin and the Norm Macdonald comedy Dirty Work. His final film was The Replacements in 2000, opposite Gene Hackman and Keanu Reeves.

Personal life
Warden married French actress Vanda Dupre on October 10, 1958. They had one son, Christopher. Although they separated in the late 1970s, the couple never legally divorced.

Warden's health declined in his later years, which resulted in his retirement from acting in 2000. He lived for the rest of his life in Manhattan, New York City, with his girlfriend, Marucha Hinds. He died of heart and kidney failure in a New York City hospital on July 19, 2006, at the age of 85.

Filmography

Film

Television

Awards and nominations

References

External links

Cinema2000 obituary 

1920 births
2006 deaths
20th-century American male actors
American male boxers
American male film actors
American male stage actors
American male television actors
American people of Irish descent
American people of Pennsylvania Dutch descent
Boxers from Newark, New Jersey
Deaths from kidney failure
Male actors from Newark, New Jersey
Military personnel from New Jersey
Outstanding Performance by a Supporting Actor in a Drama Series Primetime Emmy Award winners
United States Army non-commissioned officers
United States Army personnel of World War II
United States Merchant Mariners
United States Merchant Mariners of World War II
United States Navy personnel of World War II
United States Navy sailors